Laurenz Beckemeyer (born 16 April 2000) is a German professional footballer who plays as a goalkeeper for VfL Osnabrück.

Career
Beckemeyer made his professional debut for VfL Osnabrück in the 2. Bundesliga on 28 June 2020, coming on as a substitute in the 90th minute for Nils Körber in the away match against Dynamo Dresden, which finished as a 2–2 draw.

References

External links
 
 
 

2000 births
Living people
People from Lingen
Footballers from Lower Saxony
German footballers
Association football goalkeepers
2. Bundesliga players
VfL Osnabrück players